Armenian Australians refers to Australians of Armenian national background or descent. They have become one of the key Armenian diasporas around the world and among the largest in the English-speaking world. 

While the Armenian community in Australia is relatively recent compared to other Armenian diasporas, Australia's economic prosperity over the last couple of decades has attracted many skilled Armenian migrants. The official relationship between Australia and Armenia started on 26 December 1991, and diplomatic relations were established on 15 January 1992.

Overview 
The influx of Armenians into Australia has come from many different Diaspora countries; these countries include Armenia, Egypt, Iran, Lebanon, Syria, Jordan, Israel, Turkey, Ethiopia, and India.

Today the Australo-Armenian community includes members born in up to and over 43 different countries. The main concentration of Armenians in Sydney are in the City of Ryde (12,000 – 15,000) followed by City of Willoughby and City of Warringah. Smaller communities exist in Adelaide, Brisbane, and Perth.

Organisations
All traditional Armenian diaspora parties have established in the country:
 Social Democratic Hunchakian Party
 Armenian Democratic Liberal Party
 Armenian Revolutionary Federation

There are also many associated political groupings like:
 Armenian Youth Federation of Australia
 Armenian National Committee of Australia

Other operating social and cultural organisations within the Armenian Australian community:
 Armenian General Benevolent Union
 Hamazkayin Regional Committee breaking down into sub-divisions/committees.
 SBS Armenian Radio
 Armenian Chamber of Commerce in Australia
 Homenetmen Australia
 Hye Hoki

Cultural centres
In Sydney there are several main cultural centres to which Armenians gather, one located in Willoughby, New South Wales named the Armenian Cultural Centre and another located in Bonnyrigg, New South Wales named the Armenian Cultural Panoyan Centre, and smaller Cultural Centres in Neutral Bay, City of Ryde, Frenchs Forest (Ararat Reserve) and Naremburn, Sydney.
Melbourne also has several cultural centres.

Education 
Armenian is an accepted language in the NSW HSC.  Also known as Armenian Continuers, the course is taught at Saturday schools or as a subject at full-time Armenian schools.

Armenian Schooling has become stronger throughout the Australian community with two full-time schools operating in Sydney.  These are:

 Galstaun College
 AGBU Alexander Primary School

Alongside which a number of Saturday schools operate as listed below:

 Toomanian Armenian Saturday School
 AGBU Alex Manoogian Saturday School
 Tarkmanchatch Armenian Saturday School
 Serop Papazian Armenian Saturday School
 Looyce Armenian Catholic School

Religion 
The oldest and largest Armenian church in Australia and throughout the world is the Armenian Apostolic Church, which in Australia is led by Archbishop Haigazoun Najarian who is the Primate of the Australian and New Zealand Armenian Apostolic churches and replaced Archbishop Aghan Baliozian. The Armenian Catholic community is led by Father Parsegh (Basil) Sousanian. there is also a presence of the Armenian Evangelical Church in Sydney and Melbourne in addition to the Holy Trinity Armenian Brotherhood Church and the Armenian Evangelical Brethren Church, both in Sydney.
 The Armenian Apostolic Church is located in Chatswood, New South Wales.
 The Armenian Apostolic Church of Holy Trinity in Wentworthville, New South Wales.
 The Armenian Catholic Church is located in Lidcombe, New South Wales.
 The Armenian Evangelical Church can located in Willoughby, New South Wales.
 The Armenian Brotherhood Holy Trinity Church is located in Ryde, New South Wales.
 The Armenian Evangelical Brethren Church is located in Northbridge, New South Wales.

Notable Armenian Australians 
The Australian Armenian community has produced many notable figures who have become key members who shape the identity of Armenians in Australia. Below are a few of these members.

 Gladys Berejiklian – Member of NSW Parliament, Treasurer, Premier of New South Wales.
 Vic Darchinyan –  Three-division world champion boxer.
 George Donikian – Network Ten news presenter.
 Brian Goorjian – Regarded as Australia's most successful basketball coach.
 Slava Grigoryan – classical guitarist, two time ARIA winner.
 Jano Toussounian – Australian/Armenian actor.
 Joe Hockey (Armenian father's surname was "Hokeidonian" before he arrived in Australia) – Member of Federal Parliament – Treasurer. Ambassador of Australia to the United States of America from 2016
John Kachoyan – Director and writer.
 Yurik Sarkisian – Olympic Silver medalist and two time World Champion weightlifter, set 17 world records during his career.

See also 
 Armenia–Australia relations
 Armenian diaspora
 Immigration to Australia
 Assyrian Australians
 Iraqi Australians 
 Lebanese Australians
 Turkish Australians

References

External links 
 http://www.agbu.org.au
 http://www.aacca.com.au/
 http://www.ararat.org.au/
 http://www.nareg.com.au/nas/
 http://armenianchurchsydney.org.au
 http://www.anc.org.au/
 http://www.ayfaustralia.org

Armenian diaspora by country
Ethnic groups in Australia
 
Asian Australian